Maungatautari is a mountain, rural community, and ecological area near Cambridge in the Waikato region in New Zealand's central North Island.

The Maungatautari Restoration Project is the largest ecological restoration project in New Zealand. The project is engineered to remove all non-native pest mammals and predators and restore endangered native flora and fauna to Maungatautari. There is no intention to restrict all introduced birds, but efforts will be made to control exotic wasps. It includes private land and a government-owned scenic reserve administered by Waipa District Council. It is a community project managed by the Maungatautari Ecological Island Trust.

Maungatautari Marae and Te Manawanui meeting house located on the northern edge of the mountain, overlooking the Waikato River. It is a meeting place for the Ngāti Korokī Kahukura hapū of Ngāti Hourua and Ngāti Ueroa, the Ngāti Raukawa hapū of Ngāti Korokī and Ngāti Mahuta and the Waikato Tainui hapū of Ngāti Korokī and Ngāti Raukawa ki Panehākua. It is the main marae for the, Taute, Kara, Tupaea, Wirihana, Poka and Tauroa whānau, among others.

Waniwani Pā is also a traditional meeting ground for the Ngāti Korokī Kahukura hapū of Ngāti Waihoro.

History

According to Waikato Tainui oral history, the mountain was named by Rakatāura / Hape, the tohunga of the Tainui migratory canoe. After settling at the Kawhia Harbour, Rakatāura and his wife Kahukeke explored the interior of the Waikato.

Geology

A wide range of volcanic rocks are found from pumiceous and ash flow deposits near the summit  and  hydrothermally altered andesite on its southern flanks to labradorite, pyroxene, and hornblende andesite and dacite in the bulk of the stratovolcano and a small cone of olivine basalt is located at Kairangi,  to the northwest. However the Kairangi cone is much older being the most eastern of the basaltic Alexandra Volcanic Group. Maungatautari's surface ring plain deposits are mainly on the northern and northeastern flanks and include a prominent rock and debris avalanche to the north east of volume ,  as to its south and east the flanks are covered by the younger and very thick ignimbrite sheets from the massive Mangakino caldera complex eruptions of about 1 million years ago.

Ecological area

Maungatautari, as an eroded volcano was chosen as a suitable site for a major ecological project for a number of reasons, including the diversity of its terrain, the relative integrity of natural areas in spite of some human engineered changes, the commitment of surrounding communities, and the feasibility of fence-construction given surrounding developed terrain.

Some elements of the diversity of Maungatautari took scientists by surprise. In April 2006, the discovery of 100 silver beech trees caused considerable excitement in the botanical community. The tree, native to southern New Zealand, had not previously been believed to be present on Maungatautari, although researchers who came to investigate emphasized that the tree had probably been established during the last ice age. The largest of the trees were estimated to be several centuries old. Jim Mylchreest, Maungatautari Trust's chief executive, pointed out that the trees were not only exciting in themselves, but also for the fungi and insects they might host that also may not have been expected to be present on Maungatautari.

Species found

In December 2004, eleven endangered Hochstetter's frogs were found living on Maungatautari in a rocky region. There had already been discussions about potentially reintroducing the Hochstetter's frog to the preserve, and the rare discovery of the small population in an environment being prepared to protect them excites the scientific community.

A dead Duvaucel's gecko was found in a mouse trap in March 2010; this was the first sighting of this species on mainland New Zealand for almost 100 years, probably indicating a surviving population of the gecko within Maungatautari.

Ecological restoration plan
Because poisons and trapping, traditional methods of pest control, have limited success and seldom last long, the creators of the plan decided to enclose the 34 square kilometres of bush with a 47 km pest-exclusion fence to create an ecological island. When the environment was rendered suitable, the area was to be repopulated with the entire suite of charismatic species that may now be locally extinct, such as North Island brown kiwi, North Island kōkako, kakariki, tuatara and many others. Kaka already visited regularly and were likely to become resident if suitable methods are employed.

In November 2003, the Trust constructed two exclosures, at the north and south of Maungatautari, totalling 1.1 square kilometres.  The Trust used these areas to demonstrate the fence's feasibility and to test pest removal methods, which were launched in September 2004. The exclosures are now predator-free and were used as holding areas for native species while the main fence was being built.

In November 2005 a 3 hectare area adjacent to the Southern Enclosure, the Tautari Wetland, was gifted to the Trust by the Tauroa family for takahē and other wetland birds. A Tuatarium for the future was designed and planted inside the area.

In July 2004, the Trust began constructing the Xcluder fence. In September 2006 the Trust completed fencing the entire 34 square kilometres to exclude all pests (and was able to take advantage of parts of the exclosures' fencing constructed at Stage 1). Then the Trust began eliminating pests by dropping poison, starting with brodifacoum in November 2006. A second application was made in December 2006. The combined effect of the poison, trapping and hunting eliminated brown rats, black rats, stoats, cats, weasels, ferrets, red deer, fallow deer, pigs, goats, possums, hedgehogs, rabbits and hares. In 2007 the sole remaining pest species was mice, and poison was dropped a third time, in September that year, to eradicate them. This failed, and in 2011 the trust introduced a new policy, focusing on controlling rather than eradicating mice.

One of the greater challenges facing the designers of the Xcluder fence adopted for the purpose was addressing entry at streams. Since water levels fluctuate and a fence needed to address both debris and fish migration, the Xcluder was outfitted with an electronic surveillance system to alert the Trust if a watergate fails to properly close. There have been other challenges with the fence, including storm damage in July 2007 that was quickly repaired.

In July 2006, a viewing tower was constructed near a northern rata grove in the southern exclosure.

Species reintroduction

Since the beginning of the project, native species have returned to the area either naturally or through reintroduction. In July 2007, a 300% increase was discovered in the native beetle population of the southern enclosure.

In December 2005 Maungatautari witnessed its first kiwi call in approximately a hundred years. Radio signals in April 2007 suggested that the kiwi may be sitting on an egg, but that nest was found to be bare. In September 2007, two kiwi eggs were discovered. Although one proved infertile, the other hatched in December 2007, the first kiwi egg known to have hatched on Maungatautari in a century. 

As of 2021, 320 founders of the North Island brown kiwi (Apteryx mantelli) western taxon have been introduced.

In June 2006, the Trust began reintroducing species, starting with a pair of critically endangered takahē. In April 2007, three species of endangered whitebait (kokopu or native trout) were reintroduced. In May, kākā were put into a special enclosure to allow them to acclimatise before they were released; they quickly attracted wild companions. In November of that year, seven kākā were released from the aviary.

On 3 December 2007  the trust announced that they planned to reintroduce North Island robins, North Island kōkako, tuatara, popokatea (whiteheads) and hihi (stitchbirds) in 2008. March 2009 saw the release of 60 whiteheads (popokatea).

Between 2009 and 2011, 155 hihi (stitchbirds) were released over 3 translocations (135 from Tiritiri Matangi Island and 20 from Little Barrier Island).

2011 saw the release of 40 North Island robins from Pureora Forest with a further 40 in 2012.

In 2012 and 2013 200 Mahoenui giant weta (Deinacrida mahoenui) were introduced into the sanctuary. Also in 2012, 50 tuatara from Stephens Island were reintroduced.

In 2013, 40 North Island saddleback were translocated from Tiritiri Matangi Island.

In 2015, 40 North Island kōkako were translocated from Pureora Forest.

In 2021, 80 rifleman (bird), titiponamu were translocated from Pirongia and Pureora.

Native species

Mammals
 New Zealand long-tailed bat (Chalinolobus tuberculatus)

Birds

 Grey teal (Anas gracilis)
 Australasian shoveler (Anas rhynchotis)
 Grey duck (Anas superciliosa)
 New Zealand bellbird (korimako) (Anthornis melanura)
 North Island brown kiwi (kiwi) (Apteryx mantelli) 
 Australasian bittern (Botaurus poiciloptilus) 
 Shining cuckoo (Chrysococcyx lucidas)
 Australasian harrier (Circus approximans)
 White-faced heron (Egretta novaehollandiae)
 New Zealand falcon (kārearea) (Falco novaeseelandiae)
 Grey warbler (riroriro) (Gerygone igata)
 New Zealand kingfisher (Halcyon sancta) 
 Wood pigeon (kererū) (Hemiphaga novaeseelandiae)
 Welcome swallow (Hirundo neoxena)
 Morepork (Ninox novaeseelandiae)
 Stitchbird (hihi) (Notiomystis cincta)
 North Island tomtit (Miromiro) (Petroica macrocephala toitoi)
 Whitehead (pōpokotea) (Mohoua albicilla)  
 Black shag (Phalacrocorax carbo)
 Little pied cormorant (Phalacrocorax melanoleucos)
 New Zealand dabchick (Poliocephalus rufopectus)
 Takahē (Porphyrio hochstetteri)
 Pūkeko (Porphyrio porphyrio)
 North Island fantail (Piwakawaka) (Rhipidura fulginosa placabilis)
 Paradise shelduck (Tadorna variegata)
 Silvereye (Zosterops lateralis)
 Tūī (Prosthemadera novaeseelandiae)
 Kākā, (Nestor meridionalis)

Amphibians
 Hochstetter's frog (Leiopelma hochstetteri)

Reptiles
 Copper skink (Cyclodina aenea)
 Forest gecko (Hoplodactylus granulatus)
 Pacific gecko (Hoplodactylus pacifica)
 Auckland green gecko (Naultinus elegans elegans)
 Duvaucel's gecko (Hoplodactylus duvaucelli)

Fish
 New Zealand longfin eel (Anguilla dieffenbachii)
 Giant kokopu, (Galaxias argenteus)
 Banded kokopu, (Galaxias fasciatus)
 Shortjaw kokopu, (Galaxias postvectis)

Invertebrates
 Onychophora
 Mecodema oconnori 
(Survey yet to be done)

Community

The main township of Maungatautari is on the northern slopes of the volcano, between its peak and the Waikato River. Horohora township is to its north west. Pukeatua  township is on the southern flank of the volcano over looked by a south eastern peak called Te Akatarere.

Demographics
The SA1 area is part of the larger Maungatautari statistical area.

The SA1 area had a population of 135 at the 2018 New Zealand census, an increase of 12 people (9.8%) since the 2013 census, and an increase of 18 people (15.4%) since the 2006 census. There were 51 households, comprising 69 males and 69 females, giving a sex ratio of 1.0 males per female. The median age was 35.4 years (compared with 37.4 years nationally), with 27 people (20.0%) aged under 15 years, 30 (22.2%) aged 15 to 29, 57 (42.2%) aged 30 to 64, and 18 (13.3%) aged 65 or older.

Ethnicities were 91.1% European/Pākehā, 17.8% Māori, 2.2% Pacific peoples, and 2.2% other ethnicities. People may identify with more than one ethnicity.

Although some people chose not to answer the census's question about religious affiliation, 46.7% had no religion, 48.9% were Christian, and 2.2% had Māori religious beliefs.

Of those at least 15 years old, 18 (16.7%) people had a bachelor's or higher degree, and 21 (19.4%) people had no formal qualifications. The median income was $36,900, compared with $31,800 nationally. 18 people (16.7%) earned over $70,000 compared to 17.2% nationally. The employment status of those at least 15 was that 69 (63.9%) people were employed full-time, 12 (11.1%) were part-time, and 3 (2.8%) were unemployed.

Maungatautari statistical area

Maungatautari statistical area had a population of 822 at the 2018 New Zealand census, an increase of 72 people (9.6%) since the 2013 census, and an increase of 105 people (14.6%) since the 2006 census. There were 303 households, comprising 414 males and 408 females, giving a sex ratio of 1.01 males per female. The median age was 39.0 years (compared with 37.4 years nationally), with 165 people (20.1%) aged under 15 years, 165 (20.1%) aged 15 to 29, 390 (47.4%) aged 30 to 64, and 102 (12.4%) aged 65 or older.

Ethnicities were 89.1% European/Pākehā, 12.0% Māori, 1.1% Pacific peoples, 3.3% Asian, and 1.5% other ethnicities. People may identify with more than one ethnicity.

The percentage of people born overseas was 18.6, compared with 27.1% nationally.

Although some people chose not to answer the census's question about religious affiliation, 54.4% had no religion, 36.5% were Christian, 1.8% had Māori religious beliefs, 0.4% were Hindu, 0.7% were Buddhist and 1.5% had other religions.

Of those at least 15 years old, 141 (21.5%) people had a bachelor's or higher degree, and 87 (13.2%) people had no formal qualifications. The median income was $41,200, compared with $31,800 nationally. 138 people (21.0%) earned over $70,000 compared to 17.2% nationally. The employment status of those at least 15 was that 381 (58.0%) people were employed full-time, 96 (14.6%) were part-time, and 15 (2.3%) were unemployed.

Education

The school was established in 1909.

Maungatautari School was a primary school established in 1903 and closed in 2011.

See also
 List of volcanoes in New Zealand

References

External links
 Maungatautari Restoration Project

Waipa District
Populated places in Waikato
Environment of Waikato
Nature reserves in New Zealand
Wildlife sanctuaries of New Zealand
Conservation projects in New Zealand
Protected areas of Waikato
Cambridge, New Zealand
Volcanoes of Waikato
Mountains of Waikato
Landforms of Waikato
Populated places on the Waikato River